Michael Adye Smith (30 January 1886 – 5 June 1965) was an Australian politician.

He was born in Sassafras in Tasmania. In 1944 he was elected to the Tasmanian House of Assembly as a Labor member for Darwin in a recount following the resignation of Thomas d'Alton. He was defeated at the election in 1946. Smith died in Latrobe in 1965.

References

1886 births
1965 deaths
Members of the Tasmanian House of Assembly
Australian Labor Party members of the Parliament of Tasmania
20th-century Australian politicians